Ragam surname (in Telugu రాగం) is a commonly used surname by the Kapu or Telaga caste people who live in the Andhra Pradesh and Telangana states of India.

The people with Ragam surname belong to Palangula Gotra who lives in coastal regions of Andhra Pradesh in the Guntur and Krishna districts on the banks of Krishna River.

In Kapu culture, surnames have more importance compared to caste names when recognizing people.

In recent days, most of the population does not use caste titles in their names, but only uses surnames to denote their lineage.

References

Surnames
Indian surnames